, also known in its short form as Yu-Shibu, is a Japanese light novel series written by Jun Sakyou and illustrated by Masaki Inuzumi. The series was awarded Gold in the 23rd Fantasia Awards. An anime adaptation by Asread aired from October to December 2013.

Plot
The story revolves around a young man named Raul Chaser who dreamed of becoming a hero with his team of skilled heroes-in-training, but due to the collapse of the Demon Empire, the Hero Program was suspended. With Raul's dream crushed, he was forced to find a new line of work and ended up employed at a small department store called Magic Shop Leon. Raul's life since then has been busy but dull, when one day someone arrives at the store applying for a job. Raul finds out that the new hire is the Demon Lord's child and also happens to be a cute girl.

Characters

Raul is a former Hero candidate at the Hero School. He had to find a job after the Demon Lord was defeated and he could not become a Hero. Raul meets the Demon Lord's daughter who is in search of a job, and at first mistakes her for a boy. He is often annoyed by her but at the end of the day is glad that she is around and likes her positive enthusiasm. 

Phino is the daughter of the deceased Demon Lord. She lacks common sense due to living in the Demon World and is really carefree. She is very positive and very funny. Phino involuntarily tends to scare off many customers because of her weird way of speaking about violent things when discussing products with them. She might be harboring some feelings for Raul.

Raul's self-proclaimed former rival from Hero School. After she could not become a Hero either, she started working as bunnygirl in the shop that's rivals with Leon shop, but instead lies to Raul about being a security guard. Due to the fact that she always scored top marks in her examinations, Raul usually addresses her as "All A". She likes Raul, but she's tsundere so she denies it when pointed out. 

The manager of the magic shop, who is always smiling. She has a very soft angelic voice, and is very nice to her workers and appears as if she sometimes tries to involve Raul and Phino in situations that would make them attracted to each other. She can also change magical items to fight with.

Childhood friend of Seara and the assistant manager of the magic shop, Visor was once a magic engineer. He sometimes mocks Raul to not do anything stupid with his employees. He cares a lot about the shop.

Part of the magic shop's staff, Nova is a cheerful but really clumsy girl. Although sometimes an old man who "shops" at Leon tends to stroke her buttocks whenever in the premises, she actually doesn't mind getting touched like that.

Part of the magic shop's staff, she is Raul's upperclassman. She works mostly with the deliveries and doing mechanics such as fixing faults, so Lore isn't often seen in the shop. Very quiet, tomboyish, and reserved.

Elza is the manager of Lawson Station, a convenience store next to the magic shop. She is fascinated by catalogs of magical items. She also likes Raul, something that is occasionally teased by her coworker and friend Ramdimia. 

An employee at Lawson Station like Elza, who's also from the Demon World. Her name is well known in the Demon World, so she mostly gets annoyed when people shorten her name (such as "Ram-chan"), so she often corrects them by stating her full name. She is coworkers and a friend of Elza and teases her about her obvious crush on Raul.

Media

Light novels
The light novels are written by Jun Sakyou, and illustrated by Masaki Inuzumi. It was published by Fujimi Shobo. Its original run began on January 20, 2012, and finished on July 20, 2014, with 10 total volumes.

Anime
The anime television series aired in Japan from October 5 to December 21, 2013. It was produced by Asread and directed by Kinji Yoshimoto, with Masashi Suzuki handling series composition and writing the scripts, Tetsuya Takeuchi designing the characters and Hiroaki Tsutsumi and Masaru Yokoyama composing the music. There are a total of 12 episodes + 1 OVA overall.

References

External links
 Official light novel website 
 Official anime website 
 

2012 Japanese novels
2013 manga
2013 anime television series debuts
Anime and manga based on light novels
Asread
Fantasy anime and manga
Fujimi Fantasia Bunko
Fujimi Shobo manga
Gangan Comics manga
Kadokawa Dwango franchises
Light novels
Sentai Filmworks
Shōnen manga
Tokyo MX original programming